The Nizam College is a constituent college of Osmania University established in 1887 during the reign of Mir Mahbub Ali Khan, Asaf Jah VI, in Basheerbagh, Hyderabad, Telangana.

History

The Nizampur University College was originally the "Mirsarai" of Nawab Safdar Jung Musheer-ud-Daulah Fakhrul-ul-Mulk II the owner of the grand Errum Mnzil palace. Fakhar ul mulk and Khan-i-Khanan II, were the son's of Nawab Fakhar-ul-mulk I, a noble of Hyderabad.

The founder of the college and of several other educational institutions in the Hyderabad State, was Syed Hussain Bilgrami (Nawab Imad-ul- Mulk), who did pioneering work in the field of education as the Director of Education. He scouted and then appointed Dr. Aghorenath Chattopadhyay ( father of Sarojini Naidu, Nightingale of India) as the first principal of the college. The present building, was a summer palace of Paigah Nawab Mulk Fakrul Bahadur, later he gifted the palace to the college administration.

Institution
This college is an autonomous, constituent college of Osmania University. It is located near Lal Bahadur Shastri Stadium in Hyderabad. Nizam College was originally a palace of Fakhrul-ul-mulk II, a noble of Hyderabad.

Nizam College celebrated its centenary in 1987. It was established in 1887 by the amalgamation of the Hyderabad School (Noble School) and Madarsa-I-Aliya. Initially it was affiliated to the University of Madras for 60 years and was made a constituent college of Osmania University on 19 February 1947.

The college was granted autonomous status by the UGC in the year 1988–89 at undergraduate level and continues to enjoy this status. It is also NAAC accredited and has been given CPE (College with Potential for Excellence) grant by the UGC. The college has its own academic bodies viz., Governing Body, Academic Council, Finance Committee, Internal Quality Assurance Cell and Boards of Studies for each department to monitor its academic, financial and other activities to the desired level of satisfaction of the appropriate authorities.

The college offers both the undergraduate as well as postgraduate courses in the Faculties of Management, Arts and Social Sciences, Science, and Commerce. At present the college has 29 teaching departments. In addition to these courses, several students are pursuing their Doctoral and Post-Doctoral programmes.

Courses of Study
The college has undergraduate courses B.B.A., B.Sc., B.A. and B.Com.  It also has B.C.A. 
There are 13 postgraduate programs leading to M.A., M.Sc. and M.Com degrees. There is a new 5-year integrated M.Sc. course in Chemistry. 
The college also has M.B.A., M.C.A and M.Sc. (IS) professional courses.
In addition there are almost a dozen add-on courses: Certificate, Diploma and PG Diploma courses

Notable alumni

 Abid Hussain
Ali Yavar Jung
Subodh Markandeya (well known Senior Advocate of India)
Air Chief Marshal Idris Hasan Latif, Indian Air Force
Anabheri Prabhakar Rao
Kazi Zainul Abedin
Suri Bhagavantam
Kailasa Venkata Ramiah
Chandra Siddhartha
G. Ram Reddy
Ghulam Ahmed
M. L. Jaisimha
Suravaram Pratapareddy
Syed Mohammad Hadi
Mohan Kanda
P. Surya Prakash
Wing Commander Rakesh Sharma
Shyam Benegal
P.V.Narasimha Rao
Mohammed Azharuddin
Sarojini Naidu
Madhu Goud Yaskhi
Nandamuri Balakrishna
Kiran Kumar Reddy
Mariadas Ruthnaswamy
Asaduddin Owaisi
Kotla Jayasurya Prakasha Reddy
Sitaram Yechury
Y. S. Jaganmohan Reddy
K. T. Rama Rao
Babu Gogineni

See also 
Education in India
Literacy in India
List of institutions of higher education in Telangana

References

External links

Universities and colleges in Hyderabad, India
Education in the princely states of India
Academic institutions formerly affiliated with the University of Madras
Educational institutions established in 1887
1887 establishments in India
Colleges affiliated to Osmania University
Establishments in Hyderabad State